The Soweto Derby is a football rivalry between Premier Soccer League's Kaizer Chiefs and Orlando Pirates in South Africa. It was first contested on 24 January 1970. Matches between the two rivals attract a large fanbase. The rivalry is recognised as one of the biggest derbies in Africa.

Based in Soweto, Johannesburg, the rivalry stems from the fact that Kaizer Chiefs was formed by a former Orlando Pirates star Kaizer Motaung. Motaung had left Orlando Pirates to go play professional soccer in the now defunct North American Soccer League for a team called the Atlanta Chiefs. Upon returning home, he found a lot of infighting among the hierarchy at Pirates. He decided to form a Kaizer XI, which initially played friendly matches with various clubs in South Africa and then this entity evolved to the Kaizer Chiefs.

Overall record

Win percentage(%)

All-time results

League

Cup results

* Played as a neutral game with one side designated as the 'home team'.

Honours

Head-to-head ranking in the South African Premier Division (1996–2021)

 Total: Kaizer Chiefs with 13 higher finishes, Orlando Pirates with 12 higher finishes (as of the end of the 2020–21 season).
 The biggest difference in positions for Kaizer Chiefs from Orlando Pirates is 7 places (2016–17season), The biggest difference in positions for Orlando Pirates from Kaizer Chiefs is 7 places (2018–19 season).

References 

Association football rivalries
Kaizer Chiefs F.C.
Orlando Pirates F.C.
1970 establishments in South Africa
Recurring sporting events established in 1970